VHHS may refer to several high schools in the United States of America:
Verdugo Hills High School in Tujunga, Los Angeles, California
Vernon Hills High School in Vernon Hills, Illinois
Vestavia Hills High School in Vestavia Hills, Alabama
In Adelaide Australia:
Victor Harbor High School on the South Coast, Victor Harbor